The Kurdish languages are written in either of two alphabets:  a Latin alphabet introduced by Celadet Alî Bedirxan in 1932 called the Bedirxan alphabet or Hawar alphabet (after the Hawar magazine) and a Perso-Arabic script called the Sorani alphabet or Central Kurdish alphabet. The Kurdistan Region has agreed upon a standard for Central Kurdish, implemented in Unicode for computation purposes.

The Hawar alphabet is used in Syria, Turkey and Armenia; the Central Kurdish in Iraq and Iran. Two additional alphabets, based on the Armenian alphabet and the Cyrillic script, were once used by in Kurds in the Soviet Union, most notably in the Armenian Soviet Socialist Republic and Kurdistansky Uyezd.

Hawar alphabet

The Kurmanji dialect of the Kurdish language is written in an extended Latin alphabet, consisting of the 26 letters of the ISO basic Latin Alphabet with 5 letters with diacritics, for a total of 31 letters (each having an uppercase and a lowercase form):

In this alphabet the short vowels are E, I and U while the long vowels are A, Ê, Î, O and Û (see the IPA equivalents in the Help:IPA/Kurdish table).

These three glyphs do not have the official status of letters, but serve to represent these sounds when they are indispensable to comprehension.

Turkey does not recognize this alphabet. Using the letters Q, W, and X, which did not exist in the Turkish alphabet until 2013, led to a trial in 2000 and 2003 (see , p. 8, and ). Since September 2003, many Kurds applied to the courts seeking to change their names to Kurdish ones written with these letters, but failed.

The Turkish government finally legalized the letters Q, W, and X as part of the Turkish alphabet in 2013.

Kurdish Latin alphabet
The Kurdish Latin alphabet was elaborated mainly by Celadet Bedirxan who initially had sought the cooperation of Tawfiq Wahbi, who in 1931 lived in Iraq.  But after not having received any responses by Wahbi for several months, he and his brother Kamuran Alî Bedirxan decided to launch the Hawar alphabet in 1932. Celadet Bedirxan aimed to create an alphabet that didn't use two letters for representing one sound. As the Kurds in Turkey already learned the Turkish Latin alphabet, he created an alphabet which would specifically be accessible for the Kurds in Turkey. Some scholars have suggested making minor additions to Bedirxan's Hawar alphabet to make it more user-friendly. The additions correspond to sounds that are represented in the Central Kurdish alphabet, but not in the Hawar alphabet. These scholars suggest this extended alphabet be called the Kurdish Latin alphabet. The suggested additional characters are Ł, Ň, Ř and Ü. The velar Ł/ł which appears mostly in Central Kurdish is for non-initial positions only; in Kurdish velar Ł never comes in initial position, except for in Kurmanji. The initial position in any Kurdish word beginning with r is pronounced and written as a trill Ř/ř. The letter Ü/ü is a new letter, which is sometimes written  in the Central Kurdish alphabet, and represents the close front rounded vowel [y] used in the Southern Kurdish dialects. The velar nasal consonant [ŋ] is also a Kurdish phoneme which never comes in initial position, and it is written as Ň/ň. The Kurdish Latin alphabet consists of 35 letters in total.

Sorani alphabet

Sorani is mainly written using a modified Persian alphabet with 33 letters introduced by Sa'id Kaban Sedqi. Unlike the Persian alphabet, which is an abjad, Central Kurdish is almost a true alphabet in which vowels are given the same treatment as consonants. Central Kurdish does not have a complete representation of Kurmanji Kurdish sounds, as it lacks i. Written Central Kurdish also relies on vowel and consonant context to differentiate between the phonemes u/w and î/y instead of using separate letters. It does show the two pharyngeal consonants, as well as a voiced velar fricative, used in Kurdish. Reformed Central Kurdish does have glyphs for the "i" ⟨⟩ and it is able to successfully differentiate between the consonant "w" and the short vowel "u" by representing "w" with a ⟨⟩. It is also able to successfully differentiate between the consonant "y" and the long vowel "î" by representing "î" with a ⟨⟩ and the long vowel "û" can be represented with a ⟨⟩ or ⟨⟩ instead of double ⟨⟩.

A new sort order for the alphabet was proposed some time ago by the Kurdish Academy as the new standard, all of which are letters accepted included in the Central Kurdish Unicode Keyboard:

The alphabet is represented by 34 letters including  which is given its own position. Kurds in Iraq and Iran use this alphabet. However, the latter glyph is still in use by various individuals and organizations.

Vowels 
Central Kurdish has eight vowels, whilst only seven are represented by letters:

Central Kurdish stipulates that syllables must be formed with at least one vowel, whilst a maximum of two vowels is permitted.

Historical alphabets

Old Kurdish script

An old Kurdish alphabet is documented by the well known Muslim author Ibn Wahshiyya in his book (Shawq al-Mustaham) written in 856 A.D. Ibn Wahshiyya writes: "I saw thirty books in Baghdad in this alphabet, out of which I translated two scientific books from Kurdish into Arabic; one of the books on the culture of the vine and the palm tree, and the other on water and the means of finding it out in unknown ground." It has also been claimed that the Old Kurdish script, like several other scripts found in Ibn Washiyya's book, are fantastical inventions.

Cyrillic script
A third system, used for the few (Kurmanji-speaking) Kurds in the former Soviet Union, especially in Armenia, used a Cyrillic alphabet, consisting of 40 letters.
It was designed in 1946 by Heciyê Cindî:

Armenian alphabet
From 1921 to 1929, a modified version of the Armenian alphabet was used for Kurmanji, in the Armenian Soviet Socialist Republic:

It was then replaced with a Yañalif-like Latin alphabet during the campaigns for Latinisation in the Soviet Union.

Soviet Latin alphabet 
In 1928, Kurdish languages in all of the Soviet Union, including the Armenian Soviet Socialist Republic, were switched to a Latin alphabet containing some Cyrillic characters:  a, b, c, ç, d, e, ә, f, g, г, h, i, ь, j, k, ʀ, l, m, ɴ, o, ө, w, p, n, q, ч, s, ш, ц, t, u, y, v, x, z, ƶ. In 1929 it was reformed and was replaced by the following alphabet:

Yazidi alphabet 

The Yazidi script was used to write in Kurdish, specifically in the Kurmanji dialect (also called Northern Kurdish). The script was found in historical manuscripts Meṣḥefa Reş and Kitêba Cilwe, these two manuscripts are largely considered to be western forgeries mixed with some authentic traditions. In 2013, the Spiritual Council of Yazidis in Georgia decided to revive the Yazidi script. It is written from right to left. The modern version of Yazidi is an alphabet and does not use ligatures.

The Yezidi script was added to Unicode version 13.0 in March 2020. 47 characters are located in the Yezidi block:

Comparison of Kurdish alphabets

See also

 Kurdish typography
 Help:IPA/Kurdish

Notelist

References

External links
 KAL – A table of the various Kurdish alphabets
 Omniglot: Kurdish language, alphabet and pronunciation
 Kurdish Unicode Fonts

Latin alphabets
Arabic alphabets
Persian alphabets
Kurdish language
Writing systems of Asia
Cyrillic letters
Cyrillic alphabets